Moise (died 29 August 1530) was a Voivode (Prince) of Wallachia from January or March 1529 to June 1530, son of Vladislav III. His rule marks the willingness of the boyars to compromise, in order to prevent rules like that of Basarab VI - in which the Ottomans appointed the Prince and profited of his submission.

Moise initially maintained a close relationship with Sultan Suleiman the Magnificent: on Turkish orders, he sent an embassy to Sibiu demanding that the Transylvanian city submit to Ottoman vassal Hungarian King John Zápolya; when refused, Moise's army, placed under the leadership of Seneschal Drăgan din Merişani and Neagoe din Periş (the assassins of Radu de la Afumaţi and, possibly, of Basarab V) attacked and plundered the outskirts.

After the Siege of Vienna, the Prince attempted to cut off his country's links to the Porte and align it with Ferdinand of Austria and Ferdinand's regional ally, Moldavian Prince Petru Rareş. This move was backed by the Craioveşti family, but by few other boyars. On February 13, 1530, Moise ordered the murder of several in the opposition, including Drăgan and Neagoe, during his wedding to a sister of a Craioveşti Ban; the rest took refuge in Ottoman lands and elected Vlad Înecatul as the new Prince, with Ottoman recognition. Vlad stormed the country in May, and, by early June, Moise had to take refuge in Sibiu. The officials in Poienari were sent by Vlad to ask that Moise be turned over or killed - since he was now an ally, Sibiu refused.

On August 24, with Imperial backing, Moise re-entered Wallachia through the Rucăr-Bran Passage; he was joined by Craioveşti troops at Slatina, and fought Vlad Înecatul at Viişoara (in Teleorman), on 29 August. He suffered a major defeat and was killed on the spot.

References 

|-

1530 deaths
Rulers of Wallachia
16th-century rulers in Europe
Military personnel killed in action
16th-century Romanian people
Year of birth unknown
House of Dănești